8th Central Committee may refer to:
Central Committee of the 8th Congress of the Russian Communist Party (Bolsheviks), 1919–1920
8th Central Committee of the Bulgarian Communist Party, 1962–1966
8th Central Committee of the Chinese Communist Party, 1956–1969
8th Central Committee of the Communist Party of Cuba, 2021–2026
8th Central Committee of the Socialist Unity Party of Germany, 1971–1976
8th Central Committee of the Workers' Party of Korea, 2021–2026
8th Central Committee of the Polish United Workers' Party, 1980–1981
8th Central Committee of the Romanian Communist Party, 1960–1965
8th Central Committee of the Lao People's Revolutionary Party, 2006–2011
8th Central Committee of the Communist Party of Vietnam, 1996–2001
8th Central Committee of the League of Communists of Yugoslavia, 1964–1969
8th Central Committee of the Hungarian Socialist Workers' Party, 1962–1966